Sandnes Sentrum Station is a railway station in the city of Sandnes which lies in the western part of Sandnes Municipality in Rogaland county, Norway. The station is located in the downtown, harbour area of the city of Sandnes (in the borough of Trones og Sentrum). The station is served by regional trains to Kristiansand and Stavanger along the Sørlandet Line and by local trains on the Jæren Commuter Rail network from Stavanger Station to Egersund Station. The station has a waiting room, ticket machines, and food kiosks, but few other services.

History

The original station for Sandnes, Sandnes Station, was opened with the Jæren Line in 1878.  The new Sandnes Sentrum station in the center of Sandnes was completed in 1992, and the old station converted to a stop for only regional trains.

References

Railway stations on the Sørlandet Line
Railway stations in Sandnes
Railway stations opened in 1878
1878 establishments in Norway